Shien Biau Woo (born August 13, 1937) is a Chinese American professor and politician from Newark, Delaware. He was a member of the Democratic Party and served as the 21st lieutenant governor of Delaware.

Early life and family 
Woo's ancestral hometown is Yuyao, Zhejiang Province. He was born in 1937 in Shanghai. His parents fled the Chinese Communist Revolution in 1949 to Hong Kong with him, he studied at Hong Kong Pui Ching Middle School, and then he came to the United States at the age of 18. He received undergraduate degrees in Mathematics and Physics from Georgetown College in Kentucky and his PhD in Physics from Washington University in St. Louis.

He married in 1963 and has two children. In 1966, he joined the faculty of the University of Delaware, where he became a professor of physics and astronomy. He retired in 2002 after 36 years.

Political career 
In his first attempt at public office, Woo was elected Lieutenant Governor in 1984. He won the Democratic primary election by defeating two veteran state senators, Nancy W. Cook of Dover and David McBride of New Castle. In the general election he narrowly defeated Republican Battle R. Robinson of Georgetown, who was the first woman to practice law in Sussex County and the assistant legal counsel to retiring Governor Pete du Pont. Woo thus became one of the highest ranking Chinese American public office holders in the nation and served one term from January 15, 1985 until January 20, 1989.

Woo narrowly won the Democratic primary election for U.S. Senator in 1988, defeating Samuel S. Beard, an heir to a railroad fortune and resident of Greenville, Delaware. In fact, the election appeared to be lost until an error in the tabulation was discovered, which changed the result. Nevertheless, Woo lost the general election to the incumbent Republican Senator William Roth. Likewise, in 1992, he was the Democratic candidate for the U.S. House from Delaware's sole congressional district, but lost the election to retiring Gov. Mike Castle by twelve points.

Woo became an Independent in 2000 and announced his intention not to accept a federal appointment in order to advance public perception of his neutrality without any personal partisan benefit.

Professional career 
Woo is a leader in the greater Chinese American community throughout the country from which his political activities dependably received strong financial backing. He is the former president of the 80-20 Initiative, a group that attempts to organize Asian Pacific Americans (APAs) into a swing bloc-vote in presidential elections, intending to induce both major political parties to take the interests of the APA community into consideration. 
He also serves as a Professor Emeritus of Physics and Trustee of the University of Delaware, and an Institute Fellow at the Harvard Institute of Politics at Harvard Kennedy School.

A life-sized picture of him is displayed in Smithsonian's National Museum of American History in Washington D.C. Another picture of him is in an interactive display in the lobby of Asia Society in New York City. In 2000, A Magazine ranked him the 6th of the 25 Most Influential Asian Americans.

Almanac 
Elections are held the first Tuesday after November 1. The Lieutenant Governor takes office the third Tuesday of January and has a four-year term.

See also 
 List of minority governors and lieutenant governors in the United States

References

External links 
 Delaware’s Lieutenant Governors 
 80-20 Initiative 

|-

1937 births
American politicians of Chinese descent
Asian-American people in Delaware politics
Delaware Democrats
Delaware Independents
Georgetown College (Kentucky) alumni
Hong Kong emigrants to the United States
Harvard Kennedy School people
Lieutenant Governors of Delaware
Living people
People from Newark, Delaware
Politicians from Shanghai
University of Delaware faculty
Washington University in St. Louis alumni
Washington University physicists